The Lithuania women's national rugby sevens team represents Lithuania in international rugby sevens competitions and is controlled by Lithuanian Rugby Federation. Lithuania currently competes in European B division. The team's coach is Donatas Streckis.

References

External links
Lithuania rugby federation

Rugby union in Lithuania
Rugb
Women's national rugby sevens teams